West Studdal is a village near Dover in Kent, England. The population of the village is included in the civil parish of Sutton.

Villages in Kent
Dover District